The Real World Homecoming: New Orleans is the third and final season of the spin-off miniseries of The Real World, that reunited the cast members of the ninth season of the show. It is the first season of Homecoming to include all cast members living in one house. Multiple cast members have criticized the edit of the episodes for not telling the full story of events and placing events out of order.

Overview
A few months after the first season premiered, The Real World Homecoming was renewed for two more seasons on September 29, 2021, without specifying which cast would be reunited for the third season. Production reportedly had unsuccessfully reached out to the San Francisco, Boston, Seattle, and Hawaii casts, and could not agree for each of those casts to reunite. On March 31, 2022, it was announced that the third season would premiere on Paramount+ on April 20, 2022.

This season addressed recurring themes of the series including intersectionality and race, sexuality, religion, and a revisiting of the "Don't ask, don't tell" military policy. In May 2022, The New York Times profiled Danny Roberts as an icon for LGBT millennials. At the conclusion of the series, Variety called the series "genius reality TV".

Episodes

References

External links

2022 American television seasons
Television shows set in New Orleans
The Real World (TV series)
Television shows filmed in New Orleans